It's Almost Dry is the fourth studio album by American rapper Pusha T. It was released on April 22, 2022, by GOOD Music and Def Jam Recordings; the album is Pusha T's final album with both labels. The album features guest appearances from Kanye West, Jay-Z, Pharrell Williams, Kid Cudi, Lil Uzi Vert, Don Toliver, Nigo, Labrinth, and Malice. West and Williams also served as executive producers with Williams producing six tracks, West producing five and the pair producing one track together (Rock N Roll). The album also includes production from Labrinth, Ojivolta, FnZ, BoogzDaBeast, Luca Starz, and ThaMyind.

It's Almost Dry received widespread critical acclaim from music critics, with some comparing it to Pusha T's previous album, Daytona. It debuted at number one on the US Billboard 200 chart, earning 55,000 album-equivalent units in its first week.

Background
On April 19, 2022, Pusha was interviewed by Rolling Stone, in which he explained the meaning of the album title, saying,

Release and promotion
On April 19, 2022, Pusha officially shared the album's cover art and revealed its tracklist. On April 22, 2022, the same day the album was released, Pusha appeared as a musical guest on The Tonight Show Starring Jimmy Fallon and held an album listening party in New York City, titled Cokechella. On January 24, 2022, he shared an image of American singer Lana Del Rey with her face seemingly obscured by a pile of cocaine. He later revealed that he posted the image with the belief that he and the singer talk about similar subjects in their music. According to Pusha, Del Rey's label contacted him shortly after, to request him getting on a remix. The day before the image was posted, Pusha had previewed new music in Paris, with several snippets showing up on various celebrities Instagram stories. On January 28, 2022, Pusha shared a post on Instagram of a contract indicating him signing off on Def Jam Recordings, writing that "some people call you their brother, other people show you you're brothers". In the post, he also expressed his gratitude to fellow American rapper and one of the producers involved in the album, Kanye West, with saying "Thanx Yezos", a play on the name of Amazon founder Jeff Bezos, a moniker also used to reference West in the lyrics of certain songs on the album. Pusha's manager, Steven Victor, confirmed that It's Almost Dry was set to be his last album under the Def Jam label and that he now owns his masters because of West. On April 18, 2022, Pusha announced that a public listening party would be held in New York that same week. Later that day, he officially announced the album's release date while sharing a snippet from the then-unreleased song "I Pray for You." The album ended up leaking on the same day, four days before its official release.

Singles
The album's lead single, "Diet Coke", was released on February 8, 2022. The next single, "Hear Me Clearly", a collaboration with Japanese fashion designer and record producer Nigo, was released on March 4, 2022. The third single, "Neck & Wrist," which features American rapper Jay-Z and American singer-songwriter and record producer Pharrell Williams, was released on April 6, 2022. The fourth single, "Scrape It Off," which features American rapper Lil Uzi Vert and American rapper and singer Don Toliver, was sent to urban contemporary radio on May 10, 2022.

Critical reception

It's Almost Dry received widespread critical acclaim. According to Metacritic, which assigns a normalized rating out of 100 to reviews from mainstream publications, the album received an average score of 83 based on 15 reviews. Marcuss Shorter of Consequence wrote that the album "drips confidence from knowing Pusha is one of a few artists who can do what he does at a very high level" and called it "the perfect complement to Daytona, creating Pusha's very own gangster saga on wax".

TiVo Staff of AllMusic wrote that "with fourth solo album It's Almost Dry, Pusha T does what he does best -- deliver larger than life storytelling rhymes about drug dealing and street struggles -- only bigger, better, and more polished to perfection than before" and "upgrading significantly from 2018's brief and scattered-feeling Daytona, It's Almost Dry finds Pusha T in the role of the cool, collected, bulletproof rapper".

Commercial performance
It's Almost Dry debuted at number one on the US Billboard 200 chart, earning 55,000 album-equivalent units (including 9,000 copies in pure album sales) in its first week. This became Pusha's first number-one album. The album also accumulated a total of 59.11 million on-demand streams of the album's songs.

Track listing

Notes
 Two alternate configurations of the track listing were released three days after the original: on the first configuration, It's Almost Dry: Ye vs. Pharrell, West's six produced tracks were moved to the start and Williams' six produced songs moved to the end of the track listing. The inverse occurred on the second configuration, titled It’s Almost Dry: Pharrell vs. Ye.

Sample credits 
 "Dreamin' of the Past" contains samples from "Jealous Guy", written by John Lennon, as performed by Donny Hathaway.
 "Diet Coke" contains samples from "Take the Time to Tell Her", written by Jerry Butler and Marvin Yancy, as performed by Jerry Butler and samples from Verzuz Battle, as performed by Fat Joe.
 "Just So You Remember" contains samples from "Six Days War" written by Brian Farell and performed by Colonel Bagshot.
 "Rock n Roll" contains an uncredited sample from "1+1", written by Beyoncé Knowles-Carter, Terius Nash, and Christopher Stewart, as performed by Beyoncé.

Personnel
Musicians
 Mike Larson – programming (2, 4, 8–9)
 Ojivolta – programming (2)
 Shelly Berg – programming (2)
 Budapest Scoring Choir – choir (2)
 Fat Joe – additional vocals (6)
 88-Keys – programming (6)
 Christina Nicholas – additional vocals (8)
 Kanye West – programming (10)
 BoogzDaBeast – programming (10)
 Luca Starz – programming (10)
 ThaMyind - programming (10)

Technical

 Manny Marroquin – mixing (1-5, 8–11)
 Michelle Mancini – mastering (1-5, 7–12)
 Mike Dean – mixing (6-7, 12), mastering (6)
 Anthony Vilchis – mix assistance (1-5, 8–11)
 Trey Station – mix assistance (1-5, 8–11)
 Zach Pereyra – mix assistance (1-5, 8–11)
 Sean Solymar – mix assistance (6-7, 12)
 Tommy Rush – mix assistance (7, 12)
 Fabian Marasciullo – immersive mixing (10)
 Mike Larson – recording (1-2, 4–5, 7–12)
 Andrew Coleman – recording (3)
 Nathaniel Alford – recording (3, 5)
 Gimel "Young Guru" Keaton – recording (4)
 Robert Ulsh – recording (3, 6–7, 9, 12)
 Andrés Osorio – recording (7)
 William J. Sullivan – recording (7)
 Benjamin Thomas – recording (9)
 Derek Anderson – recording (9)
 Nick Valentine – recording (10)
 Morgan David – recording assistance (1-2, 4, 9–10, 12)
 Noah Hashimoto – recording assistance (3)
 Ben Sedano – recording assistance (9)
 Josh Haddad – recording assistance (9)
 Mikalai Skrobat – recording assistance (9)
 Maximilian "Vandal" Deak – recording assistance (10)
 Bálint Sapszon – vocal production (2)
 Dénes Rédly – vocal engineer (2)

Design
 Kanye West – art direction
 Sterling Ruby – cover design

Charts

Weekly charts

Year-end charts

References

External links

2022 albums
Pusha T albums
Albums produced by 88-Keys
Albums produced by FnZ
Albums produced by Kanye West
Albums produced by Labrinth
Albums produced by Pharrell Williams
Def Jam Recordings albums
GOOD Music albums